, or , is a book and magazine publisher established in 1959 and based in Chiyoda, Tokyo, Japan.

Magazines
Weekly Manga Goraku
Comic Heaven
Bessatsu Manga Goraku
Manga Goraku Nexter
Golf Lesson Comic
Manga Pachinko Dairenshō
Hissatsu Pchisuro Fan
Keiba Gold
Illust Logic
Skeleton Club
Conbini Comic Kawaguchi Hiroshi Tankentai Mikaku Ninseibutsu no 5-banashi

External links

 Official Nihon Bungeisha site 

 
Publishing companies established in 1959
Book publishing companies in Tokyo
Magazine publishing companies in Tokyo
Manga distributors
1959 establishments in Japan